Hypoceromys is a genus of flies in the family Stratiomyidae.

Species
Hypoceromys albisetosa Lindner, 1935
Hypoceromys australis Lindner, 1958
Hypoceromys jamesi (Lindner, 1965)
Hypoceromys nigripes (Lindner, 1938)
Hypoceromys similis Lindner, 1952

References

Stratiomyidae
Brachycera genera
Taxa named by Erwin Lindner
Diptera of Africa